The Heber K. and Rachel H. Bankhead House, at 185 E 800 South in Wellsville, Utah, was built in 1897.  It was listed on the National Register of Historic Places in 1997.

It is Late Victorian in style.  It is a one-and-one-half-story, red brick, house with a central block and projecting bays, built upon a concrete-covered stone foundation.

References

External links

		
National Register of Historic Places in Cache County, Utah
Victorian architecture in Utah
Buildings and structures completed in 1897